Elena Mauti Nunziata (born 28 August 1946 in Palma di Campania, Naples) is a retired Italian opera singer.

She initially attended the Teatro Lirico Sperimentale in Palermo where she was taught by Gina Cigna, and made her unofficial debut in Sicily as Musetta in La Boheme. Her first recognized success on the stage was as Palermo in Bellini's I Puritani. A soprano lirico, she gained notability playing Violetta in the opera Traviata, a remarkable 1977 production in Madrid, and afterwards played the popular Nedda in the opera Pagliacci. Other notable performances include leading roles in Puccini's Madama Butterfly and Verdi's Trovatore and Forza del Destino. While she ended her international career playing Magda in La Rondine and Tosca from the famous opera by Puccini, during the 1990s she performed again in the Teatro Regio di Torino in the role of Francesca da Rimini.

In the late 90s, while still in good vocal health, Elena Mauti Nunziata left the opera scene with a farewell concert in Brescia, where she performed the end of Act 1 of Traviata.

Sources
McClean, Eric, "Montreal Opera confident as it maps out future", The Montreal Gazette, 24 March 1984, p. C2
Metropolitan Opera, Performance Record:Mauti-Nunziata, Elena (Soprano) on the MetOpera Database
Rich, Maria F. (ed.), "Mauti Nunziata, Elena". Who's Who in Opera, Arno Press, 1976, p. 350. 
The New York Times, "Soprano Sings Mimi In Her Debut at Met", 7 November 1977, p. 43
Zurletti, Michelangelo, "Con un Trovatore guerriero Verdi e tornato all'Arena", La Repubblica, 6 July 1985, p. 21

External links
Interview with Elena Mauti-Nunziata, November 22, 1982

1946 births
People from the Province of Naples
Italian operatic sopranos
Living people
20th-century Italian women  opera singers